The following highways are numbered 38A:

United States
Maryland Route 38A
 Nebraska Highway 38A (former)
 Nevada State Route 38A (former)
 New York State Route 38A
 County Route 38A (Otsego County, New York)
 County Route 38A (St. Lawrence County, New York)
 County Route 38A (Suffolk County, New York)
 South Dakota Highway 38A (former)